Mary Burrus Williams (born September 5, 1941) is the co-author with her sister, Dixie Burrus Browning, of historical novels under the pen name Bronwyn Williams.

Williams is the youngest of four children of the late Major League baseball player Maurice "Dick" Burrus and his wife Rebecca Stevens.

Biography
Williams was born September 5, 1941, in Elizabeth City, North Carolina, also the birthplace of her mother.  At two weeks of age, she returned with her mother to Hatteras Island, North Carolina, where the Burrus family lived for generations. Williams has two sisters, Dixie and Sara, and one brother, Steve, now deceased.

Williams married Dennis Williams of Kinnakeet, North Carolina, in 1960.  Dennis served in the United States Coast Guard for thirty years.  After retirement, the couple returned to their Hatteras Island home.

In 1988, Williams and Dixie published their first historical romance, White Witch, under the pseudonym Bronwyn Williams (a combination of their married names).

References

20th-century American novelists
American romantic fiction writers
American women novelists
Living people
1941 births
20th-century American women writers
People from Elizabeth City, North Carolina
Novelists from North Carolina
20th-century pseudonymous writers
Pseudonymous women writers